Apennine may refer to:
The Apennine Mountains

Other places on Earth
The Apennine or Italian Peninsula
Apennins, a department of the First French Empire

Astronomical names
The lunar Montes Apenninus
10959 Appennino, an asteroid

Plants and animals
Appenninica, or Apennine, a modern breed of domestic sheep
Apennine shrew, an insectivore endemic to Italy
Apennine yellow-bellied toad, an amphibian endemic to Italy
Apennine deciduous montane forests, an ecoregion of Italy
Apennine brown bear, another name for the Marsican brown bear
Apennine wolf, a subspecies of the Eurasian wolf
Apennine hare, another name for the Corsican hare
South Apennine mixed montane forests, an ecoregion

Cultural objects
Apennine Base Tunnel, a railway tunnel of Italy
The archaeological Apennine culture
Giro dell'Appennino, a bicycle tour